Mooroolbark railway station is located on the Lilydale line in Victoria, Australia. It serves the eastern Melbourne suburb of Mooroolbark, and opened on 10 October 1887.

History
Mooroolbark station opened on 10 October 1887 and, like the suburb itself, is named after an Indigenous word meaning 'red earth'. The name came from a cattle run that leased to John Gardiner, with the land stretching from Brushy Creek to Olinda.

In 1949, flashing light signals were provided at the former Manchester Road level crossing, which was located at the up end of the station.

In 1981, a number of sidings at the station were abolished. In 1983, boom barriers were provided at the level crossing. In 1985, the former ground-level Platform 2 was provided, along with new track which allowed down trains to enter the platform. This was in conjunction with the provision of automatic signalling between Mooroolbark and Lilydale.

In June 2001, Mooroolbark was upgraded to a Premium Station.

In October 2013, three small shelters were built at the ends of both former ground level platforms. Platform 1 had shelters at each end, while Platform 2 had one at the down (Lilydale) end. Both platforms also had a raised section installed, reducing the need for a wheelchair ramp to be used.

In 2015, the Level Crossing Removal Authority announced the removal of the Manchester Road level crossing. Work commenced in 2020, with a rail-over-road configuration. The project was scheduled to be completed by 2022, however, on 19 November 2021, the rebuilt station reopened to passengers.

There is a crossover at the up end of the station, which allows services to terminate and return. The station also marks the end of the double track on the Lilydale line.

Platforms and services
Mooroolbark has one island platform with two faces. It is served by Lilydale line trains.

Platform 1:
  all stations and limited express services to Flinders Street; all stations services to Ringwood and Lilydale

Platform 2:
  all stations services to Lilydale

Transport links
Ventura Bus Lines operates four routes via Mooroolbark station, under contract to Public Transport Victoria:
 : to Chirnside Park Shopping Centre
 : to Lilydale station

Gallery

References

External links
 Melway map at street-directory.com.au

Premium Melbourne railway stations
Railway stations in Melbourne
Railway stations in Australia opened in 1887
Railway stations in the Shire of Yarra Ranges